Cerreto Grue is a comune (municipality) in the Province of Alessandria in the Italian region Piedmont, located about  east of Turin and about  southeast of Alessandria.

Cerreto Grue borders the following municipalities: Costa Vescovato, Montegioco, Sarezzano, and Villaromagnano.

Demographic evolution

References

Cities and towns in Piedmont